Southland is an American crime drama television series created by writer Ann Biderman and produced by Warner Bros. Television. The series was broadcast on NBC for one season in 2009, followed by four seasons on TNT from 2010 to 2013.

Its first season on NBC had seven episodes that aired from April 9 to May 21, 2009. In May 2009, NBC announced that Southland had been renewed for a second season with an initial 13-episode order to begin airing on September 25, 2009. In August 2009, shortly before its scheduled premiere, NBC moved the opening of its second season to October 23, 2009, citing the need to promote the show more fully. In October 2009, two weeks before the scheduled premiere of the second season, NBC announced that the series had been canceled after one season.

In November 2009, TNT announced it had purchased the rights to the original seven episodes of Southland, as well as six completed episodes from its second season. Southland began airing its second season on TNT on January 12, 2010. In April 2010, TNT announced it had picked up Southland for a ten-episode third season to begin airing on January 4, 2011. TNT's revival of the show included a substantial budget cut and corresponding cast reduction. Southland was renewed for a ten-episode fourth season in March 2011, which premiered on January 17, 2012. The series was renewed for a ten-episode fifth season which began airing February 13, 2013. In May 2013, TNT announced that Southland had been canceled after five seasons.

Premise

Southland takes a "raw and authentic look" at Los Angeles and the lives of the LAPD officers who police it. The show's first season centers on the experiences and interactions of LAPD patrol officers and detectives, and is more a character-driven drama than a police procedural.

Among the characters are rookie Officer Ben Sherman and his training officer, John Cooper who, unknown to most of his colleagues, is gay; Detective Lydia Adams, who must balance work with the responsibility of living with her mother; Officer Chickie Brown, who aspires to be the first woman on the LAPD's elite SWAT team; and Detective Sammy Bryant, whose home life interferes with his working life.

After its first season on NBC, Southland moved to TNT. The second season placed less emphasis on the ensemble cast, instead focusing more on the Adams, Sherman, Cooper and Bryant characters and their partners. The weekly stories also centered more on how crimes came together, with fewer serialized story lines.

Cast and characters

Main cast

Recurring cast

Production
The series was created by Emmy Award-winning writer Ann Biderman, who began her television writing career on the first season of police drama NYPD Blue. The series' executive producers are Biderman, Christopher Chulack, and John Wells. Wells and Chulack, both also Emmy Award winners, had previously worked together on critically acclaimed medical drama ER and emergency services drama Third Watch. Many other crew members had previously worked with Wells and Chulack on these series. Wells and Biderman also write for the series and Chulack is a regular director. Biderman left her executive producer position after the second season but continued to write for the series' third season.

Ex-police officer Angela Amato Velez served as a consulting producer and writer for the first season; she had previously worked for the executive producers on Third Watch. Dee Johnson also served as a consulting producer and writer for the first season; she had previously worked with Wells and Chulack on ER. Emmy Award-winning writing team Mitchell Burgess & Robin Green were hired as executive consultants and writers for the second and third seasons; they had previously worked together as executive producers on The Sopranos. Diana Son served as a consulting producer and writer for the second season; she had previously worked on the crime drama Law & Order: Criminal Intent.

David Graziano became a co-executive producer for the second season. Andrew Stearn was a producer for the first two seasons and was promoted to co-executive producer for the third season; he had previously worked on Third Watch. Jonathan Lisco was hired as a co-executive producer for the third season; he is a former lawyer and created the New Orleans police drama K-Ville. Jason Horwitch, creator of AMC's Rubicon, joined the show as consulting producer for the fourth season.

ER and Third Watch veteran Nelson McCormick is also a regular director for Southland. Steadicam expert J. Michael Muro serves as a regular cinematographer and occasional director for the series. Dana Gonzales is the other regular director of photography.

The producers used both actual and former gang members to play the role of gang bangers in Southland.

Episodes

Reception
Southland received positive reviews from critics. At Metacritic, which assigns a weighted mean rating out of 100 to reviews from mainstream critics, the first season received an average score of 69, based on 22 reviews and the second season received an average score of 77, based on 12 reviews both indicating "generally favorable reviews". Upon returning for its third, fourth and fifth seasons, the series received wide critical acclaim, receiving an average score of 80, based on 9 reviews for the third season, an average score of 87, based on 7 reviews for the fourth season, and an average score of 86, based on 9 reviews, all indicating "universal acclaim".

Alessandra Stanley of The New York Times compared Southland favorably to series like The Shield, Rescue Me and The Wire in citing the series debut as "one of the most gripping opening episodes of any network crime series". Noting the show's "bold, contemporary tone", Stanley concluded that "Southland is commendably stinting and cold, a series that doesn’t aim to please, and is all the more pleasurable for it." In a second review a year later, Mike Hale was less effusive in his praise. While commending the series for fine performances from its cast and its combination of straightforward immediate plots and long-range storytelling, Hale criticized the "heavyhandedness" he saw in some of the writing, noting especially the "sententious lectures about the nature of police work" delivered to Sherman by Cooper in the pilot episode. He finds the show "worthy" but in need of work to qualify as a classic.

Dorothy Rabinowitz of The Wall Street Journal says "Prattle is, in any case, a minor note compared with the crackling pace of the first script, its evocative mood of menace at every turn, each police car racing to destinations that will reveal who knows what tragedy or unspeakable sight." Matt Zoller Seitz of Vulture applauded the series' realism, and stated "It's the most engrossing cop series since season one of NBC's Homicide, and maybe the most raggedy and real."

Southland received three nominations for the Primetime Emmy Award for Outstanding Stunt Coordination, winning the award twice in 2011 and 2012, and was nominated in 2013. In 2012, the series was awarded with a Peabody Award.

Home media
Shortly before its TNT premiere, Warner Home Video released the first season on DVD in an uncensored version, with the profanities intact.

In May 2011, Warner Home Video also released the second season in a similarly uncensored version. This title is currently only available through the studio's manufacture-on-demand (MOD) program.

On February 5, 2013, a box set titled Southland: The Complete Second, Third, and Fourth Seasons was released on DVD; it included over an hour of bonus features.

On August 13, 2013, Warner Home Video released the show's final season on DVD.

References

External links 
 

2009 American television series debuts
2013 American television series endings
2000s American crime drama television series
2010s American crime drama television series
2000s American LGBT-related drama television series
2010s American LGBT-related drama television series
2000s American police procedural television series
2010s American police procedural television series
English-language television shows
Fictional portrayals of the Los Angeles Police Department
NBC original programming
Peabody Award-winning television programs
Television series by Warner Bros. Television Studios
American television series revived after cancellation
Television shows set in Los Angeles
TNT (American TV network) original programming
Television series created by Ann Biderman